Miles Jennings (born 14 July 1961) is a British businessman and five time offshore powerboat racing World Champion. Jennings formed Stovax Ltd in 1981 and a sister company, Original Style in 1986.

Racing career 
He has competed in both Inshore powerboat racing and Offshore powerboat racing for 41 consecutive years.

In 2019 Jennings raced in Britain with Drew Langdon, winning the UKOPRA Offshore 1 World Championship 2019, in Singapore winning the Asia Powerboat Championship and in America with Steve Curtis in Miss GEICO.

His recent racing highlights include:
 Harmsworth Cup Winner 2018
 UKOPRA Offshore 1 World Champion 2018
 UKOPRA Offshore 1 World Champion 2019
 Asia Powerboat Championship – Singapore 2019

See also 
 P1 SuperStock
Miles Jennings (entrepreneur), Founder of Recruiter.com Group, Inc.

References 

Motorboat racers
1961 births
Living people